The Square and Compass is a Grade II listed public house in Worth Matravers, Dorset. Built in the 18th century as a pair of cottages before becoming a public house, the Square and Compass got its name in 1830 from a landlord who had been a stonemason. The building includes a museum of fossils and other local artefacts and the pub is one of only five nationally that has been included in every edition of CAMRA's Good Beer Guide since 1974.

In 2015, the landlord built a sculpture of tree trunks, dubbed Woodhenge. He was told to take it down by the local council, but after an online petition he was allowed to keep it standing for two years. Update at 09-Dec-2020: Woodhenge remains standing.

History

The public house was originally built in the 18th century as a pair of cottages. In 1776 it became 'The Sloop', an alehouse with connections to smuggling. In approximately 1830 the landlord, Charles Bower, changed the name to the Square and Compass, as he had been a stonemason. It was bought by Charlie Newman in 1907, great-grandfather of the current proprietor of the same name. At the time it included oil lamps, no running water or flushing toilets and no bar counter. The lights are now powered by electricity and there is running water, but there is still no bar counter - drinks are served through two serving hatches.

The pub is named after Square and Compasses, the tools used by carpenters and stonemasons reflecting the significance of quarrying and stonemasonry to the local economy. It is known as Sqump to its regulars, the Square and Compass was popular amongst the Telecommunications Research Establishment scientists in Purbeck, who knew the inn as Sine and Cosine.

The public house includes a small museum which displays fossils and local artefacts. The artefacts were collected by the current landlord and his father, with the majority of fossils collected locally. In 2014, the Square and Compass won the Good Pub Guide's award for Unspoilt Pub of the Year. It is one of just five pubs, known as the 'Famous Five', to have featured in all 48 (at 2021) editions of CAMRA's Good Beer Guide since 1974.

The public house currently serves locally produced beer and cider and has events each week including live music and open mic nights.

Building

The Square and Compass was built in the 18th century of rubble stone walls, stone chimney stacks and a stone stale roof. It is a single story building with an attic, which has been converted to include dormer windows.  The nearby outbuildings which are of a similar construction have been converted to include garage doors. The building is built on a T-shape plan; there is a two-story wing to the left of the building which extends to the front and rear, which has plastered walls. The structure became a Grade II listed building on 13 December 1984.

Inside the pub are two simple rooms with flagstones, a woodburner and basic furniture. There is no bar, instead drinks are served through two serving hatches. In the garden outside the benches and tables are made of stone. 
It is on the Campaign for Real Ale's National Inventory of Historic Pub Interiors.

Woodhenge

The landlord of the Square and Compass, Charlie Newman, built a tree trunk sculpture known as Woodhenge, in the field near the public house. The trunks were originally planned to be used for firewood, before Newman built the structure, which was complete in time for the summer solstice in 2015. Newman was initially instructed to dismantle the sculpture by Purbeck District Council after a complaint from the public, as the field is within the Area of Outstanding Natural Beauty and did not meet planning regulations. After an online petition, the council decided that the structure could remain for two years.

Gallery

References

	

Grade II listed pubs in Dorset
National Inventory Pubs